JacksGap is a British inactive YouTube channel which is owned by identical twins Jackson Frayn "Jack" Harries and Finnegan Charles Frayn "Finn" Harries (born 13 May 1993). Originally created by Jack Harries to document his gap year in mid-2011, the channel experienced a rapid increase in popularity after the addition of Finn Harries as a regular contributor. In February 2017 the Twitter and Instagram accounts for JacksGap were deleted, followed by the dissolution of the JacksGap brand.

Background
Jackson and Finnegan Harries are sons of Andy Harries, a film and television director and producer, and filmmaker and writer Rebecca Frayn. Their maternal grandfather is the playwright and novelist Michael Frayn (now married to biographer Claire Tomalin). They attended The Harrodian School at Barnes, south-west London.

JacksGap was originally launched in July 2011 by Jack Harries during his gap year after he had left school. The main purpose of the channel was to document Jack's gap year. By September 2012 the site had 190,000 subscribers and the pay-per-click advertising revenue was enough to entirely finance the Harries' travels in Thailand. After Finn joined the channel, the views nearly doubled. Jack Harries attended Bristol University, studying Drama, but dropped out in 2013 after the first year to focus on YouTube.

JacksGap attracts teenage girls in particular, with 88% of subscribers in this demographic.

In 2013 the twins began to create 15-minute-long episodes about their travels in India, funding the venture with £20,000 from Skype, Sony and MyDestination.

In January 2015, JacksGap posted a video called "Let's Talk About Mental Health" that was later referenced in an article on The Huffington Post in which he addresses the importance of starting an open conversation about mental health in order to reduce the stigma attached to it.

In April 2015, JacksGap posted a video called "What Do You Believe In?" that announced Finn had moved to New York City earlier that year to study Design and Architecture for three and a half years at the Parsons School of Design, though he was still a part of JacksGap.

As of 2018, the JacksGap name has been replaced across all social media platforms in favour of "Jack Harries". The official Twitter account has also been deleted and the handle relinquished, now owned by a member of the public with no affiliation to JacksGap.

In May 2018, after two and a half years, the channel has uploaded a new video called "Jack Harries  - The Stories We Tell", which talked about depression and the relationship between his mental health and social media.

In February 2019, Jack Harries was arrested during a protest at International Petroleum Week.

Jack follows a vegan diet, citing the documentary Cowspiracy and the environmental impacts of animal product consumption.

References

British travel websites
YouTube channels